Chris Morman (born December 19, 1977 in Troy, Michigan) is a retired American soccer defender.  He played three seasons in the USL First Division, two in the USL Second Division, one in the National Professional Soccer League and four in the Major Indoor Soccer League.  He also earned three caps, scoring one goal, with the U.S. national futsal team. In January 2014, he was named interim head coach for the Cincinnati Saints of the Professional Arena Soccer League.

Career
Morman grew up in Tennessee, attending Brentwood High School where he was an All-State soccer player.  In 1995, Morman and his team mates won the state championship.  He then attended the University of South Carolina where he played on the men's soccer team from 1996 to 1999.

In 2000, he played for the Raleigh Express in the USL A-League.  The team folded at the end of the season and that fall he moved to the Harrisburg Heat of the indoor National Professional Soccer League. He would play a total of three seasons with the Heat as the NPSL was renamed the Major Indoor Soccer League for the 2001-2002 and 2002-2003 seasons. In the spring of 2001, Morman signed with the Nashville Metros for the 2001 A-League season but would not play outdoors again until 2003.

When the Heat folded following the 2002-2003 season, the Milwaukee Wave acquired his rights in an August 7, 2003, trade.  The Wave game up Victor Nogueira to acquire Morman.  He would spend the next two seasons with the Wave organization, playing two winter indoor seasons and the 2004 summer outdoor season with the team. When playing outdoors, the team was known as the Milwaukee Wave United.

In 2006, he moved to the Harrisburg City Islanders of the USL Second Division. In 2007, he won the USL-2 championship with the Islanders. He retired at the end of the season. Morman also earned three caps, scoring one goal, with the U.S. national futsal team.

Following his retirement, he became a retirement plan administrator.  On January 8, 2014, he became interim head coach for the Professional Arena Soccer League's Cincinnati Saints, replacing Matt Brienes who had led the team to a 3–6 record in its inaugural season.

External links
 USL Player Profile

1977 births
Living people
American men's futsal players
American soccer players
Penn FC players
Raleigh Flyers players
Nashville Metros players
Milwaukee Wave United players
Harrisburg Heat (NPSL) players
Harrisburg Heat (MISL) players
Milwaukee Wave players
South Carolina Gamecocks men's soccer players
USL First Division players
USL Second Division players
Soccer players from Michigan
Association football defenders
People from Troy, Michigan
Soccer players from Tennessee
People from Brentwood, Tennessee
Professional Arena Soccer League coaches